Clan Wars may refer to:

 Worms Clan Wars, a PC game by Team17
 Clash of Clans or Clash Royale, mobile games developed by Supercell featuring a game mode called "Clan Wars"
 Clan Wars, a minigame in the MMORPG RuneScape

See also 
 Video-gaming clan